The Denver Stampede were an American rugby union team that played in the short lived PRO Rugby competition. The Stampede was one of the five teams that began play in PRO Rugby's 2016 inaugural season. The team played its home matches at the University of Denver's CIBER Field. The team was led by head coach Sean O'Leary and captain Pedrie Wannenburg.

History
Reports began circulating as early as November 2015 that Denver would host a PRO Rugby team when the competition's inaugural season kicked off in April 2016. PRO Rugby officially announced on February 26, 2016 that Denver would be the competition's fifth team. Denver's first officially announced player signing was South African international Pedrie Wannenburg.

Denver hosted Ohio in the first ever PRO Rugby match on April 17, 2016, winning 16–13 at Infinity Park on a late penalty kick from flyhalf Will Magie. PRO Rugby revealed the team's nickname — the Denver Stampede — on June 6, 2016, a reference to Colorado's western theme; this name beat two other final candidates: the Peak (also a mountain western theme) and the Vipers.

On December 20, 2016 all PRO Rugby players received notice their contracts will be terminated in 30 days if progress is not made towards resolving disputes between the league and USA Rugby.

Stadia
 Infinity Park (April – May 2016)
 CIBER Field (June – July 2016)

Denver began its inaugural 2016 season playing at Infinity Park. Denver moved to CIBER Field, however, during the 2016 season; this move allowed PRO Rugby to live steam all matches on prorugby.org, and had superior financial considerations.

Current players and staff

Current roster

The squad for the 2016 PRO Rugby season:

Current coaches

Season summaries

Leading players

Head coaches

See also
 Sports in Denver

References

Rugby union teams in Colorado
Defunct sports teams in Colorado
Sports teams in Denver
Rugby clubs established in 2016
2016 establishments in Colorado
Rugby union clubs disestablished in 2017
2017 disestablishments in Colorado
PRO Rugby teams